Clyda Rovers is a Gaelic Athletic Association club based in the parish of Mourneabbey in County Cork, Ireland. The name of the club comes from the river which runs throughout the parish on its way to meet the River Blackwater. The club fields both senior Gaelic football and junior hurling teams. It is a member of Avondhu division of Cork GAA.

History
The club was founded by Fr. James Moynihan in 1888 with the original name "Mourneabbey". It was originally an all hurling club but in 1923 the club began to compete in Gaelic football also. Records show that Mourneabbey contested a Junior Football County against Canovee in 1911. However, on that occasion they lost. Throughout the '20s '30s & '40s the Club played with little success. Mourneabbey GAA Club was renamed Clyda Rovers in 1945 after The River Clyda which meanders through the parish of Mourneabbey on its way to join the River Blackwater. In the mid-1950s hurling became strongest in the parish and a first North Cork Title was won in Novice Grade in 1955, and a Football title followed in 1956 In the 1960s the club won a number of novice football Cork titles, the win in 1967 in particular was a great boost to the club.

In 1980 after a number of years of trying Clyda Rovers won their first ever Junior A Football North Cork when they defeated Ballyclough in the final. 
The 1980s was to prove a decade of unparalleled success. Clyda won 7 North Cork titles throughout the decade, 5 in Football and 2 in Hurling. They also Contested 3 County Junior Finals losing 2 football finals but winning the Junior A Hurling County against Ballinscarthy in 1989.

The 1990s began with Clyda Rovers GAA having 2 Intermediate Teams in football and in hurling. The footballers had more success than the hurlers and reached 1 County Final and 3 Semi-finals where they were narrowly defeated each time. However, on 8 September 1996 Clyda finally realised their potential when they defeated Carrigaline to win the Cork Intermediate Football Championship title. Scenes of great celebration followed and for the first time in its history Clyda was a Senior Football Club.

For the next 8 years the Clyda team gave us some historic victories, beating teams such as Muskerry, Carbery, Naomh Abhan, Bishopstown, Douglas, Duhallow to name a few. They reached the Semi-final of the Cork Senior Football Championship in 2000 and were beaten by eventual Champions Nemo Rangers. 
The Club regraded to Premier Intermediate Football in 2006. Between the Years 2009 to 2011 the club contested 3 Premier Intermediate finals but lost narrowly on each occasion to Valley Rovers, Newcestown and Newmarket. In 2010 the club won its first ever minor hurling county when they defeated St Marks in the Cork Minor B Hurling Championship final in an epic game.

After the 3 final loses under the guidance of Ned English in 2013 Clyda finally brought home the premier intermediate football title when they defeated Macroom in the county final by 13 points to 8 to secure a second intermediate county title in football

The Team then went on to reach the Munster Intermediate Football final where they played St Josephs Milltown Malbay where they won on a scoreline of 0–10 to 0–07 to cap a memorable year for the club.

Two Club players Ray Carey and Paudie Kissane made history for the Club when they were on the Cork Senior Football Team that won the All Ireland Senior Football Title in 2010 when Cork defeated Down 16 points to 15. in 2019 Conor Corbett captained the Cork Minor Footballers to all Ireland success when they defeated Galway in the final at Croke Park.  In August 2021 the first ever All Ireland hurling medal came to the club where Ben Nyhan was a player on the Cork Minor hurling team that won all Ireland honours

Its sister club Mourneabbey Ladies Football have won 2 All-Ireland club titles in Junior 2005 and Intermediate 2007, they also contested 3 Senior Club finals in 2014,2015 & 2017 finally landing the All Ireland Senior title in 2018 to scenes of great celebrations. The following year they retained their all Ireland title. They are one of the most well known Ladies Football Club teams in the country. Our juvenile club was formed in 1967 and won its first ever county title in Under-16 hurling in 2007.

In the year 2000 Clyda Rovers were looking at moving away from their base in the community centre as the facilities were now not able to cater to the growing demands of the club. However once land alongside the current community centre came up for sale Clyda Rovers GAA came to an agreement with Mourneabbey Community Council. Between 2001 and 2022 over 1.9 million has been spent developing first class facilities in Mourneabbey such as new dressing rooms and the laying of two new pitches – the main one having 400 lux floodlighting. In 2018 a new astroturf pitch was opened. Now Clyda Rovers GAA and Mourneabbbey boast a modern complex which the local area is very proud of.

The club has printed 3 club history books. 1884–1984 Clyda Rovers GAA Club History, 1985–1996 Come on Clyda, 1997–2013 A Community of Champions.

Record
 Munster Intermediate Club Football Championship: (1) 2013
 Cork Premier Intermediate Football Championship: (1) 2013 Runners-up: 2009, 2010, 2011
 Cork Intermediate Football Championship: (1) 1996  | Runners-up: 1994
 Cork Junior A Hurling Championship: (1) 1989
 Cork County Minor B Football Championship: (1) 1999
 Cork County Minor B Hurling Championship: (1) 2010
 Cork County Division 2 Football League: (1) 2014
 Cork County Intermediate Football Leagues: (2) 1991, 2011
 Cork County Minor B Football League: (2) 1999, 2018
 Cork County Minor A Football League: (1) 2009
 Cork County Minor C Hurling League: (1) 2015
 North Cork Junior A Football Championship: (5) 1980, 1986, 1987, 1988, 1989  | Runners-up: 1978, 2011
 North Cork Junior A Hurling Championship: (3) 1985, 1989, 2019  | Runners-up:1957, 1986, 2005, 2009, 2015, 2021
 North Cork Junior B Football Championship: (11) 1956, 1961, 1967, 1973, 1990, 1993, 1998, 2000, 2013, 2016, 2017
 North Cork Junior B Hurling Championship: (4) 1955, 1962, 1975, 1982
 North Cork Minor A Football Championship: (1) 2009
 North Cork Minor B Hurling Championship: (1)2010
 North Cork Minor A Football League: (1) 2009
 North Cork Under-21A Football Championship: (2) 2001,2022
North Cork Under-21B Football Championship: (9) 1986, 1989, 1991, 1993, 1999, 2004, 2010, 2016, 2021
 North Cork Under-21B Hurling Championship:  (4) 1990, 2005, 2012, 2013
 North Cork Minor B Football Championship: (2) 1989, 1999
 Rebel Og Northern Region Div 1 (Minor A) Football Championship: (1) 2019
 Rebel Og Northern Region Minor B Football Championship: (1) 2018
 Rebel Og Northern Region Div 2 (Minor B) Hurling Championship (1) 2021
 Rebel Og Northern Region Minor C Hurling Championship: (1) 2013
 Rebel Og  Northern Region Minor C Football Championship: (2) 2012, 2013
 Rebel Og  Northern Region Minor Div 1 ( Minor A) Plate: (1) 2020
 North Cork Junior A Football Leagues: (5) 1979, 1982, 1983, 1986, 1989
 North Cork Junior A Hurling Leagues: (3) 1984, 1985, 1989
 North Cork Junior B Football League: (1) 1972
 North Cork Minor B Hurling Leagues: (3) 1987, 1999, 2010
 North Cork Minor A Football League: (2) 2004, 2009
 North Cork Minor B Football League: (3) 1985, 1993, 1999
 Rebel Og Northern Region Minor Div 1 Football League: (1) 2019
 Rebel Og Northern Region Minor B1 Football League: (2) 2017, 2018
 Rebel Og Northern Region Minor C Football League: (2) 2012, 2016
 Rebel Og Northern Region Minor C Hurling League: (2) 2012, 2015
 Avondhu Div 2 Hurling League: (2) 2002, 2015
 Avondhu Div 3 Football League: (1) 1998
 Avondhu Div 2 Football League: (1) 2001
 Rebel Og Northern Region Minor Div 2 Hurling League Plate:''' (1) 2019

Notable players
 Ray Carey 
 Paudie Kissane
 Conor Corbett  
 Ben Nyhan

References

External sources
 Clyda Rovers Home Page

Gaelic games clubs in County Cork
Gaelic football clubs in County Cork
Hurling clubs in County Cork